Dashtak-e Sofla (also Romanized as Dashtak-e Soflá; also known as Dashtak, Dashtak-e Pā’īn, Dashtak Kalāsi, and Dashtak Qal”ehsi) is a village in Atrak Rural District, Maneh District, Maneh and Samalqan County, North Khorasan Province, Iran. At the 2006 census, its population was 519, in 117 families.

References 

Populated places in Maneh and Samalqan County